American heavy metal band Metallica toured throughout 2021 and 2022 in support of the 30th anniversary of their fifth and self-titled studio album Metallica, the 40th anniversary of the band, and in continuation of the WorldWired Tour. It was their first tour after the COVID-19 pandemic.
 
It kicked off on September 16, 2021 in San Francisco. The 2022 portion of the tour was titled the Return Of The European Summer Vacation.
 
Their June 29, 2022 show for Frauenfeld Rocks in Switzerland was cancelled when a member of the band tested positive for COVID-19.
 
The setlist has varied from show to show. They have played some of their hits, such as "Nothing Else Matters", "Enter Sandman", "One" and "Master of Puppets", as well surprises such as "Metal Militia".

Setlist

Sample 1 
The following setlist was performed at Discovery Park in Sacramento on October 8, 2021, when the band didn't performed any songs from The Black Album.
 
 "Whiplash"
 "Ride the Lightning"
 "Harvester of Sorrow"
 "Cyanide"
 "The Memory Remains"
 "One"
 "Frantic"
 "Moth into Flame"
 "No Leaf Clover"
 "For Whom the Bell Tolls"
 "Whiskey in the Jar"
 "Fade to Black"
 "Master of Puppets"
Encore
 "Battery"
 "Fuel"
 "Seek & Destroy"

Sample 2 
The following setlist was performed at Discovery Park in Sacramento on October 10, 2021, when the band performed all 12 songs from The Black Album in reverse order.
 
 "Hardwired"
 "The Four Horsemen"
 "Welcome Home (Sanitarium)"
 "The Struggle Within"
 "My Friend of Misery"
 "The God That Failed"
 "Of Wolf and Man"
 "Nothing Else Matters"
 "Through the Never"
 "Don't Tread on Me"
 "Wherever I May Roam"
 "The Unforgiven"
 "Holier Than Thou"
 "Sad but True"
 "Enter Sandman"
Encore
 "Fight Fire with Fire"
 "Creeping Death"

Tour dates

Cancelled dates

Personnel 
James Hetfield – lead vocals, rhythm guitar, acoustic guitar
Lars Ulrich – drums
Kirk Hammett – lead guitar, backing vocals
Robert Trujillo – bass guitar, backing vocals

References

Notes

Citations

 

Metallica concert tours
2021 concert tours
2022 concert tours
Concert tours postponed due to the COVID-19 pandemic